Krutinsky District is an administrative and municipal district (raion), one of the thirty-two in Omsk Oblast, Russia. It is located in the west of the oblast. Its administrative center is the urban locality (a work settlement) of Krutinka. Population: 17,408 (2010 Census);  The population of Krutinka accounts for 42.1% of the district's total population.

Geography
The Krutinka Lake group, with lakes Tenis-Saltaim, Ik and other smaller ones, is located in the district.

Notable residents 

Yuri Gryadunov (1929–2020), Soviet and Russian diplomat, born in the village of Sladkoye

References

Notes

Sources

Districts of Omsk Oblast